Traces of You is the seventh studio album by Indian sitarist Anoushka Shankar. It was released on 4 October 2013 through Deutsche Grammophon. The album, which is Shankar's first release since her 2011 Grammy-nominated album Traveller, was produced by British composer and multi-instrumentalist Nitin Sawhney. Traces of You features vocals by Norah Jones, Shankar's half-sister, on three tracks. In December 2014, the album was nominated for a Grammy Award in the Best World Music Album category.

Promotion
The lead single to promote the album, "Traces of You", was released internationally on 22 July 2013. "People who have gone, are still here, in us. Places we came from, are carried to the places we go," said Shankar about the song.

A music video for the track, which featured Norah Jones, was released onto YouTube on 12 September 2013. It was directed by Shankar's husband, English film director Joe Wright (Pride & Prejudice, Atonement, Anna Karenina).

Track listing

Personnel
Credits from Deutsche Grammophon website and the album liner notes:

 Anoushka Shankar – sitar on all; vocals on 7
 Norah Jones – vocals on 1, 10, and 13
 Nitin Sawhney – guitar on 1, 10, and 11; programming on 2, 3, 4, 7, 9. 10, and 11; string arrangement on 2 and 13, piano on 3 and 6; bass guitar on 7 and 10; percussion on 10; ukulele on 10
 Pirashanna Thevarajah – ghatam on 1, 8, 11, and 12; mridangam on 5, 8, and 12; moorsing on 5 and 11; vocals on 5; shaker percussion on 11; kanjira on 12
 Manu Delago – hang on 2, 4, and 5; glockenspiel on 10
 Ian Burdge – cello on 2, 4, 11, and 13
 Bernhard Schimpelsberger – udu on 5
 Kenji Ota – tanpura on 5, 7, 8, 9, and 12
 Anil Narasimha, Sandhya Chandrachood – vocals on 7
 Sanjeev Shankar – shehnai on 7 and 12
 Tanmoy Bose – tabla on 7, 10, and 12
 Aref Durvesh – tabla on 11
 Ravichandra Kulur – bansuri on 12

Charts

Release history

References

2013 albums
Anoushka Shankar albums
Deutsche Grammophon albums